Aleksandr Gubin (born 24 August 1935) is a Russian cross-country skier. He competed in the men's 15 kilometre event at the 1960 Winter Olympics.

References

External links
 

1935 births
Living people
Russian male cross-country skiers
Olympic cross-country skiers of the Soviet Union
Cross-country skiers at the 1960 Winter Olympics
Cross-country skiers at the 1964 Winter Olympics
People from Alapayevsk
Sportspeople from Sverdlovsk Oblast